Eclogavena coxeni, common name Cox's cowrie, is a species of sea snail, a cowry, a marine gastropod mollusk in the family Cypraeidae, the cowries.

Description
Eclogavena coxeni has a shell reaching a length of 14–32 mm.

Distribution
This species can be found in New Guinea, Solomon Islands.

References
 WoRMS
 Encyclopedia of Life
 Biolib

External links
 Conchology

Cypraeidae
Gastropods described in 1873